The Dominican green-and-yellow macaw (Ara atwoodi), Atwood's macaw or Dominican macaw, is an extinct species of macaw that may have lived on the island of Dominica. It is known only through the writings of British colonial judge Thomas Atwood in his 1791 book, The History of the Island of Dominica:

Austin Hobart Clark initially included these macaws in Ara guadeloupensis in 1905, but upon being referred to Atwood's writings, he listed them as a distinct species in 1908. As no archeological remains are known, it is widely considered a hypothetical extinct species. Atwood described a bird which was commonly captured for food and pets.

The Dominican macaw probably became extinct in the late 18th or early 19th century.

References

Dominican green-and-yellow macaw
Endemic birds of Dominica
Controversial parrot taxa
Dominican green-and-yellow macaw
Dominican green-and-yellow macaw
Hypothetical extinct species